The UCF Knights football team competes as part of the National Collegiate Athletic Association (NCAA) Division I Football Bowl Subdivision (FBS), representing The University of Central Florida in the American Athletic Conference.  Since the establishment of the football program in 1979, the Knights have played in thirteen bowl games.  UCF has appeared in thirteen different bowl games, with multiple appearances in the St. Petersburg (3), Liberty Bowl (2), Gasparilla Bowl (2), and the Fiesta Bowl (2). The Knights also played in the Hawai'i Bowl, the Cure Bowl, and the Peach Bowl which was a part of the Bowl Championship Series (BCS). With their most recent win in the 2021 Gasparilla Bowl, UCF has an overall bowl record of 6–7 (0.462).  They are 2-1 in BCS bowl games.

UCF's first bowl game came during the 2005 season when, under the leadership of second year head coach George O'Leary, the team underwent the fourth-best turnaround in NCAA history in his second year with the team. Before O'Leary, UCF had not made a postseason appearance since joining the FBS. As an FCS program, the Knights made the 1990 and 1993 playoffs, and were picked as the preseason No. 1 team to start the 1994 season. Since 2004, the Knights have made 13 postseason appearances, in 2005, 2007, 2009, 2010, 2012, 2013, 2014, 2016, 2017, 2018, 2019,2020, and 2021.

Key

Bowl games

See also
American Athletic Conference
Bowl Championship Series
List of UCF Knights football seasons
List of University of Central Florida alumni

References
General:
 Holic, Nathan, and the UCF Alumni Association. University of Central Florida: The Campus History Series (2009), 

In-text:

UCF Knights

UCF Knights bowl games